Svyatoslav Ihorovych Zubar (born 11 February 1993) is a Ukrainian professional footballer who plays as a striker.

Career
Zubar is a product of the local youth sportive school in his native Lviv. His first trainer was Ruslan Brunets.

He began his career in the amateurs level. Then he spent a one season in the Sweden lower league club Härnösands FF. In February 2017 Zubar returned to Ukraine and signed a contract with FC Rukh Vynnyky. He was promoted, together with the team, from the Ukrainian Second League to the Ukrainian First League.

References

External links
 
 

1993 births
Living people
Sportspeople from Lviv
Ukrainian footballers
Härnösands FF players
FC Rukh Lviv players
Ukrainian First League players
Ukrainian Second League players
Ukrainian expatriate footballers
Expatriate footballers in Sweden
Ukrainian expatriate sportspeople in Sweden
Association football forwards